Pavel Pepperstein (né Pivovarov; born in 1966, Moscow, Russia) is a Russian artist and writer.

Biography

Pepperstein was born to Irina Pivovarova, an author of children’s books, and Viktor Pivovarov, a well-known painter.
From 1985 to 1987, he studied at The Academy of Fine Arts in Prague. In 1987 he co-founded the experimental group of artists called Inspection Medical Hermeneutics (P.Pepperstein, S. Anufriev, Y.Liederman, V. Fedorov). The ideology of Medical Hermeneutics was the fusion of incompatible descriptive language, from contemporary western philosophy and Orthodox theology, Daoism and Buddhism to the language of psychiatry and pharmacology, which created a completely unique manner of expression.

Since 1989 Pepperstein has been an independent artist, writer, critic, art theorist and rap musician. His work is a continuation of the tradition started by the Moscow Conceptual School. During 1994 he was Visiting Professor at the Städelschule in Frankfurt, Germany.

His exhibitions include the 53rd Venice Biennial in 2009, in the Russian Pavilion, where his installation Landscapes of the Future was widely acclaimed and received numerous positive reviews from critics. Writing about the Venice Biennale in Süddeutsche Zeitung, Nobel laureate Orhan Pamuk said he found consolation in the work of Pepperstein, which reminds him of William Blake. In June 2014, Pepperstein was personally invited by the distinguished German curator Kasper König to appear at Manifesta 10, the European Biennial of Contemporary Art. In October 2014 Pepperstein was invited to take part in a group exhibition Manifest Intention. Drawing in all its forms at Castello di Rivoli Museo d’Arte Contemporanea. The exhibition, curated by Beatrice Merz, was entirely dedicated to the leading practitioners of the art of drawing from the last 100 years. Pepperstein’s work also features prominently in a book on contemporary figurative drawing written by Roger Malbert, a senior curator at Hayward Gallery in London. The book, entitled 'Drawing People' and published by Thames and Hudson in April 2015, focuses on contemporary artists for whom drawing is a primary means of expression and who focus on the human subject.

Roger Malbert writes, "Word and image flow from the same pen with a facility and grace that appear peculiarly timeless in the work of Pavel Pepperstein. His drawings hark back to a pre-technological age when handwriting was cultivated as the primary expression of the self, and great illustrators such as Saul Steinberg could invoke a multiplicity of styles with a few lines. In Pepperstein's universe political allegory is couched in the symbolic language of Russian Suprematism of the early twentieth century, an avant-garde so far ahead of its time that a century after its manifestation it still appears to foresee a future at which we may never arrive. Paradoxically, for a figurative artist like Pepperstein, with one foot in children's book illustration and the other in political cartoons, it is Malevich's Black Square (1915), the absolute negation of figurative imagery, that heralds the new order. This would be the mystical 'end of history', when all conflicts are resolved, gangsters no longer rule the roost and justice prevails".

Echoing the attention Malbert pays to word and image in Pepperstein's art, Boris Groys states in After the Big Tsimtsum, "Pavel Pepperstein is quite clearly more than just an artist. He is also a poet, writer, critic, curator and theorist. Above all, however, he is a designer of social spaces". The curator Hans Ulrich Obrist calls Pepperstein "one of the most important contemporary artists".

And the critic Filipa Ramos has said of Pepperstein, “In his vast body of work, the artist has explored the possibilities of combining linguistics, outlandish experiments, popular narratives, and science fiction in a way that seems to be immune to the ideals and expressive forms of post-perestroika”.

Pepperstein’s art has been exhibited in museums and galleries around the world, including The Louvre in Paris. His paintings, drawings and installations can be found in the Tretyakov State Gallery in Moscow, the Russian State Museum in St Petersburg, the George Pompidou Centre in Paris, the Deutsche Bank Collection and in many public and private collections both in Russia and abroad. 
 
In December 2014, Pepperstein was awarded the Kandinsky Prize, Russia's premier contemporary art award. Pepperstein is a somewhat mythical figure. An intensely private man, he rarely appears in public and has no permanent address or studio, preferring instead an anchoritic lifestyle and nomadic existence.

Pepperstein is also a prominent writer of fiction, known for his wild imagination and unique sense of humour. His magnum opus is «The Mythogenic Love of Castes» (Vol. 1, published in 1999, written in collaboration with Sergei Anufriev, Vol. 2, published in 2002, written by Pepperstein alone), a large-scale psychedelic novel in which the Great Patriotic War is shown through the eyes of permanently hallucinating party organizer Vladimir Dunayev (some of the creations that he encounters in his delirium evidently resemble Mary Poppins, Vinnie the Pooh, Baba Yaga and other characters from children books and folk tales). Pepperstein also published several collections of surrealistic fantasy short stories, including critically acclaimed «War Stories» (2006) and «Spring» (2010).

Selected solo exhibitions
 1995 -  Project No.3 and Freudian Dreams (with Andrei Monastyrski). Galerie Pastzi-Bott. Cologne, Germany. 
 1995 - A Game of Tennis (with Ilya Kabakov). Art Gallery of Ontario. Toronto, Canada
 1996 - A Game of Tennis (with Ilya Kabakov). Pori Art Museum, Pori, Finland
 1997 - Portrait of an Old Man. State Russian Museum. St. Petersburg, Russia
 1998 - Binoculars and Monoculars. Life and work, Kunsthaus Zug, Switzerland
 1998 - The Sweet Dark. Obscuri Viri Gallery, Moscow
 1999 - Drawings. Akademie Schloss Solitude, Stuttgart
 1999 - New drawings. Elisabeth Kaufmann, Basel
 1999 - The Father and the Son (with Viktor Pivovarov). Kunsthaus Zug. Zug, Swithzerland
 2000 - Away from the Labyrinth (with Greenman).  Museum of Israel, Jerusalem
 2000 - Russian Novel 2000. Regina Gallery, Moscow
 2000 - Moses. Kunsthaus Zug, Switzerland
 2000 - Things are in a Landscape (with Victor Pivovarov). Obscuri Viri, Moscow
 2000 - How to meet an Angel (with Ilya Kabakov). Sprovieri Gallery, London
 2000 - Two Agents (with Victor Pivovarov). Karmelienkloster, Graz, Austria
 2000 - Two Agents (with Victor Pivovarov). Kulturzentrum bei den Minoriten, Graz, Austria
 2001 - Exhibition of One Talk (with Ilya Kabakov and Boris Groys). Kunsthaus Zug, Zug, Switzerland
 2001 - The Girl and the Tunnel. Elisabeth Kaufmann, Zürich
 2001 - Zeichnungen. Galerie Romain Larivière, Paris
 2002 - Traum und Museum. Kunsthaus Zug, Zug, Switzerland
 2002 - Political hallucinations. Galerie Kamm, Berlin
 2002 - Gods and Monsters. Neuer Aachener Kunstverein, Aachen, Germany
 2002 - America. Galerie Ursula Walbrol, Düsseldorf, Germany
 2003 - Flags & Flowers. Sutton Lane, London
 2003 - Battles. Regina Gallery, Moscow
 2004 - Hypnosis. Sprovieri Gallery, London, UK
 2004 - Hypnosis. Regina Gallery, Moscow
 2004 - Hypnosis. Galerie Elisabeth Kaufmann, Zurich
 2004 - Eyes, little sister is watching you…Galerie Kamm, Berlin
 2004 - Dreams, Music and Money. Galerie Iragui, Paris
 2005 - Europa. Galerie Ursula Walbroel, Düsseldorf
 2005 - Drawings. Artplay Gallery, Moscow
 2005 - Riders on the Storm. Ministry of Culture, Düsseldorf
 2005 - Riders on the Storm. Sutton Lane Gallery, London
 2006 - Landscapes of the Future. Gallerie Kamm, Berlin
 2006 - Pentagon. Regina Gallery, Moscow, Russia
 2006 - Drawings. Kunstmuseum, Cabinet d’art Graphique, Basel
 2007 - Rembrandt. Dmitriy Semenov Gallery, St Petersburg
 2007 - City of Russia. Regina Gallery, Moscow
 2007 - Landscapes of the Future. Gallery of Modern Art, Vancouver
 2007 - Talking Animals. Kaufmann Gallery, Zurich, Switzerland
 2008 - Either/Or: National Suprematism as a Project for a New Representative Style for Russia. Regina Gallery. Moscow, Russia
 2008 - Objects Above The Sea. Sutton Lane Gallery, London
 2009 - A Suprematist Study of Ancient Greek Myths. Galerie Kamm, Berlin
 2009 - Either-Or: National Suprematism. Kewenig Galerie, Cologne
 2010 - From Mordor With Love. Regina Gallery, London
 2010 - Vesna. Artberloga Gallery, Moscow
 2011 - Leviathan. Campoli Presti Gallery, Paris
 2011 - Landscapes of the Future. Kewenig Galerie, Cologne
 2012 - Ophelia. Regina Gallery, London
 2013 - Studies of American Suprematism. Galerie Kamm, Berlin
 2013 - Murder, She said! Galería Kewenig, Palma de Mallorca
 2014 - Debris of the Future. Pace Gallery, London
 2014 - Holy Politics. Regina Gallery, Moscow
 2015 - The Future enamoured with the Past. Multimedia Art Museum, Moscow
 2015 - The Cold Centre of the Sun. Museum of Modern and Contemporary Art, Saint-Étienne
 2016 - Hunters of the marble heads. The Russian Academy of Fine Arts Museum, St Petersburg
 2016 - Abstract Memories. Kewenig Galerie, Berlin
 2017 - The resurrection of Pablo Picasso in the year 3111. Kunsthaus Zug, Switzerland
 2017 - The secret drawings of Jacqueline Kennedy. The Art Show, Art Dealers Association of America,New York

Group exhibitions
2017

 Triennial of Russian Contemporary Art. Garage Museum, Moscow

2016

 Museum (Science) Fictions. Centre Pompidou, Paris
 Russian Cosmos. Multimedia Art Museum, Moscow

2015

 Between the Pessimism of the Intellect and the Optimism of the Will. 5th Thessaloniki Biennial of Contemporary Art, the State Museum of Contemporary Art, Greece
 Walk the Line-Neue Wege der Zeichnung. Kunstmuseum Wolfsburg, Germany
 Outer Space. Der Weltraum zwischen Kunst und issenschaft, Bundeskunsthalle, Bonn, Germany
 Artists for Paris Climate 2015. Presentation of the sculpture “Flying Shell” at Charles de Gaulle airport
 Contemporary Drawing Prize 2015. Daniel & Florence Guerlain Contemporary Art Foundation, Paris

2014

 Manifesta 10, European Biennial of Contemporary Art. State Hermitage Museum, St. Petersburg, Russia
 Father, Can’t You See I’m Burning? de Appel arts centre, Amsterdam, the Netherlands

2013

 Florence and Daniel Guerlain Donation. Centre Pompidou, Paris, France
 Bergen Assembly. Triennial, Bergen, Norway
 Flow. 6th Prague Biennale, Prague
 The Politics of Play. Gothenburg Biennale, Sweden

2012

 Text-Bild-Konzepte. Stadt Mannheim Kunsthalle, Mannheim

2011

 The Global Contemporary. ZKM | Center for Art and Media, Karlsruhe
 Ostalgia. The New Museum, New York
 Modernikon. Contemporary Art from Russia, 54th Venice Biennale, Venice

2010

 Contrepoint: Russian Contemporary Art, From the Icon to the Avant-garde. Musée du Louvre, Paris
 The Beijing International Art Biennale. curated by Roger Gustafsson, Beijing
 The More I Draw, Drawing as a Concept for the World. Museum für Gegenwartskunst Siegen, Germany
 Les Utopies Mutantes. Passage de Retz, Paris
 Diary of a Madman. Regina Gallery, Moscow

2009

 Victory over the Future. 53rd Venice Biennale (Russian Pavilion), Venice
 Making Worlds. curated by Daniel Birnbaum, 53rd Venice Biennale, Venice
 Political Comics. Kunstverein Hamburg, Hamburg
 Political Comics. 3rd Moscow Biennale of Contemporary Art, Moscow
 European Drawings. Oredaria Arti Contemporanee Gallery, Rome

2008

 Total Enlightenment – Moscow Conceptual Art 1960 – 1990. Schirn Kunsthalle, Frankfurt
 Anatomie-les peaux du dessin collection. Florence et Damiel Guerlain, Frac Picardie, Amiens
 U-Turn. Quadrennial for Contemporary Art, Copenhagen

2007

 Woe from Wit. Vera Pogodina Gallery, Moscow
 Moscopolis. Espace Louis Vuitton, Paris
 Intellectual Realism. Project for 2nd Moscow Biennale, Tretyakov Gallery, Moscow
 Bird Watching. Galerie De Vishal, Haarlem, Netherlands
 Pavel Pepperstein + Arkady Nasonov: My future movies. Galerie Tanya Rumpff, Haarlem, Netherlands
 Cultural Confusion: Pavel Pepperstein, Yesim Akdeniz Graf, Hadassah Emmerich. Elisabeth Kaufmann Gallery, Zurich

2006

 Essence of Life – Essence of Art. State Russian Museum, St. Petersburg

2005

 Angels of History – Moscow Conceptualism and its influence. MuHKA Museum voor Hedendaagse Kunst Antwerpen, Antwerp
 Essence of Life – Essence of Art. Ludwig Museum – Museum of Contemporary Art, Budapest
 Ansichten. Galerie Ute Parduhn, Düsseldorf
 Russia society, since 1997. First Moscow Biennale of Contemporary Art, Moscow
 Third Triennial of Contemporary Art Oberschwaben. Weingart, Germany
 Contrabandistas de imagines. Museo de arte contemporaneo de la Universidad de Chile, Santiago de Chile

2004

 26th Sao-Paulo Biennale, Ciccillio Matarazzo Pavilion. Sao-Paulo, Brazil
 Moscow-Berlin 1950-2000. Central Historical Museum, Moscow
 Go, Russia, Go. Regina Gallery, Moscow

2003

 Moscow Conceptualists. Kupferstichkabinett Berlin
 Berlin – Moscow. Martin-Gropius-Bau, Berlin
 Korrekturen. Galerie Kamm, Berlin
 Neue Ansätze – Zeitgenössische Kunst aus Moscow. Kunsthalle Düsseldorf

2002

 Contemporary Russian Painting 1992–2002. New Manezh, Moscow

2001

 Die Ausstellung eines Gesprächs (Projekt Sammlung 4); Groys, Kabakov und Pepperstein. Kunsthaus Zug, Switzerland
 The Body Art. Biennale de Valencia, Valencia, Spain

2000

 Neues Moskau. Ifa-Galerie, Berlin

1999

 Crazy Twin. Touring exhibition organized by the Society of Collectors of Contemporary Art, Moscow with Appolonia-European Artistic Interchanges (Strasburg). Various locations: Moscow; Nizhny Novgorod; Samara; Ekaterinburg; Uaron Castle (France)

1998

 Eurorepair. Slavianski Cultural and Historical Centre, Moscow

1997

 Drawing 3, Pavel Pepperstein and Max Matter. Elisabeth Kaufmann Gallery, Basel
 Mystical Correct. Galerie Hohenthal and Bergen, Berlin
 Ecology of Emptiness. Centre of Modern Art, Moscow

1996

 How to Draw a Horse (Part 2). Central House of Artists, Moscow
 Scopes of Interpretations. Russian State Humanitarian University, Moscow

1995

 History Personalized: Contemporary Russian Art, 1956-1996. A touring exhibition of the Russian provinces organized by the Open society Institute with the Tsaritsino State Museum-Reserve, Nizhny Novgorod; Samara; Novosibirsk; Perm; Ekaterinburg
 Nonconformist Art from the Soviet Union. Collection of Tsaritsino State Museum-Reserve, Mucharnok Museum of Fine Arts, Budapest
 In Moskau…In Moscau. Badischer Kunsverein, Karlsruhe
 About Beauty. Regina Gallery, Moscow
 Dry Water. Bakhchisaray museum-preserve, Bakhchisaray, Crimea
 How to Draw a Horse (Part 1). Ipodrom, Moscow
 View on Paris from the new building window. Obscuri Viri, Moscow
 Kunst im verborgenen. Nonkomformisten Russland 1957-1995. Wilchelm-Hack Museum, Ludwigshafen, Germany; Documenta-Halle. Kassel, Germany; Staatliches Lindenau Museum, Altenburg, Germany

1994

 Victory and Defeat. Obscuri Viri, Moscow
 2nd Cetin Biennale of Modern Art, Cetin, Montenegro
 Architecture of ideas. Kunsthaus Hamburg, Hamburg

1993

 Temporal address of Russian Art. Musée de la Post, Paris
 Monuments: transformation for the future. ICA, New York
 Step East. 45th Venice Biennale, Venice
 Context Kunst 90. Kunstlerhaus Graz, Graz, Austria

1992

 A Mosca…a Mosca. Galleria d’Arte Moderna, Bologna, Italy
 Perspective of Conceptualism. North Carolina Museum of Art, USA
 Monuments: transformation for the future. ISI Central House of Artists, Moscow

1991

 ART BOOK. Riga, Latvia
 MANI Museum – 40 Moscow artists. Karmelitenkloster. Frankfurt am Main
 Private employments. 1.0 Gallery, Moscow
 Mamka-space. Sadovniki Gallery, Moscow

Books
1999. The Mythological Love of Castes (Vol.1) with Sergei Anufriev — М.: Ad Marginem, 1999. — 480 pp. — . (RUS)
2002. The Mythological Love of Castes (Vol.2)— М.: Ad Marginem, 2002. — 544 pp. — . (RUS)
2006. Svastika | Pentagon — М.: Ad Marginem, 2006. — 190 pp. — . (RUS)
2006. War Stories — М.: Ad Marginem, 2006. — 286 pp. — . (RUS)
2010. Spring — М.: Ad Marginem, 2010. — 480 pp. — . (RUS)
2012. A Prague Night — СПб.: Амфора. ТИД Амфора: М.: Ad Marginem Press, 2011. — 208 pp. —  (Амфора).  (Ad Marginem Press). (RUS)
 2014. A Prague Night (translated by Andrew Bromfield). Artwords Press, 2014.  (ENG)

References

External links
 http://www.conceptualism-moscow.org/page?id=180&lang=en

1966 births
Counterculture of the 1990s
Living people
Russian contemporary artists
Russian experimental filmmakers
Kandinsky Prize